Pajok (also Parjok, Parajok) is a community in Eastern Equatoria state of South Sudan.

The main ethnic group are the Acholi people, who live on both sides of the border between South Sudan and Uganda in this region, divided by an arbitrary boundary defined by the Colonial British in 1926.
The soil is volcanic in origin and rich.

During the Second Sudanese Civil War (1983-2005), the Sudan People's Liberation Army (SPLA) captured Pajok from the government. The SPLA was weakened by internal dissension, and Pajok was among the towns recaptured by the government between 1991 and 1994. However, by December 1995 the SPLA had regained the town. 
In 1995 Sudan and Uganda broke off diplomatic relations. The next year the Sudanese Government accused Uganda of attacking the areas of Pajok and Teit.

The civil war ended in January 2005 and reconstruction began.
The Lord's Resistance Army continued activity in and around the area, attacking the impoverished refugees in camps in north Uganda and South Sudan, including Pajok.
A report of September 2005 said that refugees were starting to return, with 1,000 out of a population of 5,000 in Pajok targeted for assistance. Work was planned to reconstruct a primary health care unit in the town.
In November 2008 UNICEF, in partnership with MEDAIR, handed over an emergency water treatment system to Pajok.
The system was built in response to a cholera epidemic, and was capable of serving 2,000 people.

A 2010 report noted that lack of adequate roads is a serious problem. The people of Pajok got a bumper harvest of sesame in 2008 but could not sell it due to the cost of transport.  As a result, they did not grow much sesame in the following year.

In 2012, a border dispute (see Ngom Oromo Dispute) between South Sudan and Uganda escalated into a series of border clashes that happened again in the April and August of 2015,  

Subclans of Pajok

Pajok is made up of several subclans. The town is divided into "Lacam and Lacwic" - literary meaning left (West) and right (East) portions of the town. Among the subclans on Lacam side are: Panto, Ayu, Biti, Pagaya, Kwac-lanyuru, Bura, Pamuda, Lamogi, Palyec, Obwolto, Panyagiri and Patogo. On Lacwic side are the Ywaya Katum, Ywaya pa Rwot, Ywaya Bol meja, Ywaya Lamwo, Oyere, Paitenge, Toro, Patanga, Paliyo, Kapaa/Paibworo and Bobi.  

Notable Pajok People

1. Hon. Benaiah Benjamin Kitara, Chairperson of Revenue Authority, Eastern Equatoria State 

2. Hon. Angela Achiro Onorio, Women representative in State Legislative Assembly

3. Hon. Tobias Xavier Lotto 

4. Hon. John Ochan Bongomin; MP-Pajok Payam, Magwi County and State Minister of Cabinet and Parliamentary Affairs  Eastern Equatoria State 

Associations

Pajok Community members are found in all the States of South Sudan and in the diaspora such as North America, Australia, New Zealand, Europe and some few in Asia. Wherever they are, Community members have strong ties with Pajok Communities across the world. They are organized into groups that serve the interests of the groups` areas of jurisdictions, those residing in Pajok and beyond. Some of those groups are Agola Kapuk Association of North America (U.S.A. and Canada), Agola Kapuk Australia Inc. and Anyira Pajok Community of South Australia whose aims include; supporting members during happy and difficult times, helping the youths to learn how to read and write Acholi, encouraging members to adapt to the laws, regulations and cultures of respective jurisdictions, promotion of the general welfare, interests and culture of Acholi Pajok women in South Australia, strengthening communication and cooperation within community in addressing Acholi Pajok women’s and children`s issues and needs and presenting a united voice on matters affecting Acholi Pajok women and children in Australia. 

In Australia, the community meets in conferences after every two years to discuss matters that are of importance to it in Australia and its people in South Sudan and its members in North America. It used to meet after every year but this was changed to two years in the Sydney 2011 conference. Apart from discussing pertinent issues in those conferences, the members find the gatherings to be an opportunity for them to meet with one another given the fact that Australia is a very large continent where people do not easily meet with each other. In 2007, the community held its first conference in Sydney; New South Wales, in 2009 - 2010, it had it in Tasmania, in 2010 - 2011, it was in Brisbane; Qld, in 2011 - 2012, it was held in Sydney; New South Wales again and in 2013 - 2014, it had it in Perth Western Australia, in 2015 - 2016, it had it in Melbourne, Victoria and In 2017 – 2018, the community will descend down to Adelaide, South Australia for its conference; in that conference, it will decide where it will hold the next conference. All these Conferences are funded by Agola Kapuk Community contributions and occasionally some additional funding is provided by respective Australia` State Governments. Agola Kapuk North America has successfully had its first Conference in Nashville, Tennessee in 2016. There is always After-Conference Party where people from all works of life are invited to attend and or participate in. Activities that take place in the After-Conference Party are Acholi traditional and contemporary music, African and western music extravaganza, free drinks and foods, catching up with mates, speeches from community and church leaders, games and fun. We are so grateful to our women and the youth for always volunteering themselves to make the events run smoothly, not forgetting participants who facilitate the discussions.

References

Populated places in Eastern Equatoria